John Benedict  (February 6, 1649 – November 11, 1729) was a member of the Connecticut House of Representatives from Norwalk, Connecticut Colony in the sessions of May 1722 and May 1725.

He was born in 1649, in Southold, Long Island which was part of the New Haven Colony at the time. He was the son of Thomas Benedict and Mary Brigham Benedict. He moved with his family to Norwalk.

He succeeded his father as deacon, and served in that position until old age. He was named a freeman 1680. He served as a selectman in 1689, from 1692 to 94 and in 1699. He was appointed part of committees to recruit a minister and a schoolmaster.

In 1686, he drew home-lot #27 in Norwalk, and in 1678, he bought a 4 acre home lot on Dry Hill.

The church honored him by voting to allow him to sit "in ye seat before ye pulpit" in 1705.

References 

1649 births
1729 deaths
Burials in East Norwalk Historical Cemetery
Connecticut city council members
Deacons
Members of the Connecticut House of Representatives
Politicians from Norwalk, Connecticut
People of colonial Connecticut